Koteshwara is a town in the Indian state of Karnataka. It is located in Kundapur taluk of Udupi district. It is one of Seven Mukthi Stala's of Karnataka pilgrimage site. It is also called Lord Parashurama kshetra.

As of 2007, 21,100 people lived in the village.

Koteshwar has a very old Shiva, Pattabhi Ramachandra and Mariamma temple.

A temple located in Koteshwar gained attention when the surrounding shallow lake was cleaned in a de-silting project under the Administration of Markod Gopalkrishna Shetty. During the cleanup a large statue was dredged up, sparking a more concerted effort which recovered several artifacts of historic and religious significance, including several sculptures, statues, bronzework and religious icons.

It is the native place of director and actor Upendra Rao

References

See also
Basrur
Kundapur
Barkur
List of temples in Tulunadu
Koteshwara Brahmin

Villages in Udupi district